Dani Bondar (born 7 February 1987) is an Israeli former footballer that played as a defender.

Biography
Bondar was born on 7 February 1987 in Moscow, Russian SFSR, Soviet Union, and in 1990 went abroad to Israel to Kibbutz Gazit in the Jezreel Valley. In Gazit, Bondar started his football career and played until the age of 12. After that, he moved to Hakoah Afek. Today Bondarv plays in Hapoel Tel Aviv as a right back.

Club career
In the summer of 2006, Bondar moved up from the youth team to the first team of Hapoel by the team coach, Itzhak Shum. Despite his young age, Bondar played in UEFA Cup game against NK Domžale in the second qualifying round of the tournament.

On 17 June 2010, it was reported that Ukrainian side Zorya Luhansk is interested in Bondar.

In August 2011 he signed with FC Volga Nizhny Novgorod. He played there until he was released in January 2013.

On September 4th 2014, Bondar had retired from his football career.

Career statistics

Club

References

External links

Footballers from Moscow
1987 births
Living people
Israeli footballers
Israel international footballers
Association football defenders
Hapoel Tel Aviv F.C. players
Hapoel Ironi Kiryat Shmona F.C. players
Russian Premier League players
FC Volga Nizhny Novgorod players
SC Tavriya Simferopol players
FC Khimik Dzerzhinsk players
Israeli Premier League players
Soviet emigrants to Israel
Israeli expatriate footballers
Expatriate footballers in Russia
Expatriate footballers in Ukraine
Israeli expatriate sportspeople in Russia
Israeli expatriate sportspeople in Ukraine
Israel under-21 international footballers
Israeli people of Russian-Jewish descent
Israeli football managers
Footballers from Northern District (Israel)